Demetris Lordos (born 3 November 1945) is a Cypriot sports shooter. He competed in the mixed trap event at the 1992 Summer Olympics.

References

1945 births
Living people
Cypriot male sport shooters
Olympic shooters of Cyprus
Shooters at the 1992 Summer Olympics
Place of birth missing (living people)